The United Nations Educational, Scientific and Cultural Organization (UNESCO) designates World Heritage Sites of outstanding universal value to cultural or natural heritage which have been nominated by signatories to the 1972 UNESCO World Heritage Convention. Cultural heritage consists of monuments (such as architectural works, monumental sculptures, or inscriptions), groups of buildings, and sites (including archaeological sites). Natural features (consisting of physical and biological formations), geological and physiographical formations (including habitats of threatened species of animals and plants), and natural sites which are important from the point of view of science, conservation or natural beauty, are defined as natural heritage. Thailand ratified the convention on 17 September 1987.

, Thailand has six sites on the list. The first three sites were listed in 1991: Historic Town of Sukhothai and Associated Historic Towns, Historic City of Ayutthaya, and Thungyai–Huai Kha Khaeng Wildlife Sanctuaries. The most recent site listed was the Kaeng Krachan Forest Complex, in 2021. Three of Thailand's sites are cultural and three are natural. Thailand also has seven sites on the tentative list.



World Heritage Sites 
UNESCO lists sites under ten criteria; each entry must meet at least one of the criteria. Criteria i through vi are cultural, and vii through x are natural.

Tentative list
In addition to sites inscribed on the World Heritage List, member states can maintain a list of tentative sites that they may consider for nomination. Nominations for the World Heritage List are only accepted if the site was previously listed on the tentative list. , Thailand lists seven properties on its tentative list.

See also
 Tourism in Thailand

References

Thailand

Thailand geography-related lists
World Heritage Sites